Gyula Glykais (9 April 1893 – 12 June 1948) was a Hungarian fencer. He won a gold medal in the team sabre event at the 1928 and 1932 Summer Olympics.

References

External links
 

1893 births
1948 deaths
Hungarian male sabre fencers
Olympic fencers of Hungary
Fencers at the 1928 Summer Olympics
Fencers at the 1932 Summer Olympics
Olympic gold medalists for Hungary
Olympic medalists in fencing
People from Pomáz
Medalists at the 1928 Summer Olympics
Medalists at the 1932 Summer Olympics
Sportspeople from Pest County